Satyapramoda Tirtha (IAST:Satyāpramoda Tīrtha; 1918 – 3 November 1997, was an Indian Hindu philosopher, spiritual leader, guru, saint and the pontiff of Uttaradi Math, a math (mutt) dedicated to Dvaita philosophy, which has a large following in southern India. He served as the 41st pontiff of Madhvacharya Peetha - Uttaradi Math from 2 February 1948 – 3 November 1997.  He had established Jayateertha Vidyapeetha in Bangalore, which has completed over 32 years.

Jayateertha Vidyapeetha
Sri Satyapramoda Tirtha established Jayateertha Vidyapeetha in 1989, which presently holds more than 200 students and 15 teaching faculty members,  in the subjects of Dvaita Vedanta, Vyakarana, Nyaya and Nyayasudha, a work on Dvaita Vedanta which has been published by this institution. It has in its custody vast collection of thousands of palm-leaf manuscripts.

Notable works
Satyapramoda Tirtha composed six major works, most of them are commentaries, glosses and few independent works. His work Nyayasudha Mandanam is an answer to Anantakrishna Sastri's, (an advaita scholar) criticism of Jayatirtha's Nyaya Sudha and the general criticism of the post-Sankara Advaita thinkers of Dvaita.

 Nyayasudha Mandanam 
 Yuktimallika Vyakhyana 
 Vaishnava Sidhantarjavam 
 Vijayendra Vijaya Vaibhavam
 Bhagavataha Nirdoshattva Lakshanaha
 Vayustuti Mandanam

See also

 Dvaita Vedanta
 Works of Madhvacharya
 Uttaradi Matha

References

Bibliography

External links

Vijayeendra Vijaya Vaibhavam (Sanskrit text)
Yuktimalika Vyakhyana (Sanskrit text)

1918 births
1997 deaths
Dvaita Vedanta
20th-century Hindu philosophers and theologians
20th-century Indian philosophers
Dvaitin philosophers
Indian Hindu saints
Uttaradi Math
Madhva religious leaders
Vaishnavism
Bhakti movement
Hindu activists
20th-century Hindu religious leaders